Mounir Barek (born 22 March 1960) is a Tunisian volleyball player. He competed in the men's tournament at the 1984 Summer Olympics.

References

1960 births
Living people
Tunisian men's volleyball players
Olympic volleyball players of Tunisia
Volleyball players at the 1984 Summer Olympics
Place of birth missing (living people)